Bountiful is a city in Davis County, Utah. As of the 2010 census, the city population was 42,552, a three percent increase over the 2000 figure of 41,301. The city grew rapidly during the suburb growth of the late 1940s, 1950s, and 1960s and was Davis County's largest city until 1985, when it was surpassed by Layton. Bountiful is Utah's 15th-largest city.

Although a part of the Ogden–Clearfield metropolitan area, it serves as a bedroom community to Salt Lake City and the surrounding area. However, due to the very narrow entrance into Salt Lake County, roads between the counties often reach near-gridlock traffic during rush hour. The FrontRunner commuter rail has been running since April 2008, and the Legacy Parkway was opened on September 13, 2008. These were built to help alleviate the traffic load on Interstate 15 through the Bountiful area.

History

Bountiful was settled on September 27, 1847, by Peregrine Sessions and his family. It was Utah's second settlement after Salt Lake City. It was known as Sessions Settlement and North Canyon Ward before being named Bountiful in 1855. This city was so named both because of the city's reputation as a great place for gardening and because "Bountiful" is the name of a city in the Book of Mormon (Alma 52:9). Most of the settlers, and also many of the present inhabitants, are members of the Church of Jesus Christ of Latter-day Saints (LDS). The city also shares 14 other religious institutions, including a Catholic school and church, Saint Olaf School, established in 1959. The Bountiful Utah Temple was dedicated in 1995 by the LDS Church. A tabernacle of The Church of Jesus Christ of Latter-day Saints is also located in Bountiful.

The city was incorporated in 1892 with Joseph L Holbrook as mayor.

In 1907 electric lights came to Bountiful through the efforts of its citizens.

Serial killer Ted Bundy snatched victim Debra Kent from Viewmont High School in Bountiful on November 8, 1974.

The city celebrates its history at the annual Handcart Days celebration every July in conjunction with the U.S. State of Utah's official holiday, Pioneer Day. Bountiful Handcart Days is a volunteer-driven event. People from three cities in the south of Davis County, Utah come together to commemorate the first group of Mormon Pioneers’ entry into the Salt Lake Valley on July 24, 1847. The festivities include a parade, fireworks, games, entertainment, an art exhibit, and food.

Geography
According to the United States Census Bureau, the city has a total area of 13.5 square miles (34.9 km), all land.

The original portion of the city and downtown is located at the base of the Wasatch Range, which rises high to the east, overlooking the city. Most of the residential neighborhoods climb high up the slopes of the mountain. To the west lies a flatland that extends to the Great Salt Lake and the mudflats and marshes that border it. Areas of Bountiful include Val Verda in the southern part of the city.

The cities surrounding Bountiful include: North Salt Lake to the south, Woods Cross and West Bountiful to the west, and Centerville to the north. Most land to the east of Bountiful is U.S. Forest Service property.

Climate

Under the Köppen climate classification system, Bountiful's climate can be described as humid subtropical (Cfa) or humid continental (Dfa) depending on which variant of the system is used.

Demographics

According to the 2020 Census, there were 45,762 people in Bountiful. The racial makeup of the county was 86.4% White, 0.8% Black, 0.5% Native American, 1.6% Asian, 1.2% Native Hawaiian/Pacific Islander, 2.8% some other race, and 6.7% from two or more races. 7.6% of the population were Hispanic or Latino.

The most common ancestries in Bountiful were English (35.1%), German (10.5%), Irish (6.7%), Danish (6.6%), and Scottish (5.0%). 

89.6% of residents speak only English at home, while 5.2% speak  Spanish, 2.9% speak other Indo-European languages, and 1.9% speak Asian and Pacific Islander languages (e.g.,  Tagalog).

Medical facilities
Lakeview Hospital is a hospital located in Bountiful.

Public schools
Elementary Schools
Adelaide Elementary
Boulton Elementary
Bountiful Elementary
Holbrook Elementary
Meadowbrook Elementary
Muir Elementary
Oak Hills Elementary
Tolman Elementary
Valley View Elementary

Junior High Schools
Bountiful Junior High School
Millcreek Junior High School
Mueller Park Junior High School
South Davis Junior High School

High Schools
 Bountiful High School
 Viewmont High School

Sights of interest
 Bountiful Utah Temple of the Church of Jesus Christ of Latter-day Saints, dedicated 1995 
 Bountiful Utah Tabernacle of The Church of Jesus Christ of Latter-day Saints, erected 1862
 Mueller Park Canyon

Notable people
 Kyle Capener, reality tv personality and candidate in Big Brother Season 24
 Bryan H. Carroll, director, producer, screenwriter and editor
 Holly Cook, 1990 World Figure Skating Championships ladies' bronze medalist
 Tyrell Crosby, NFL Player, University of Oregon football player
 Keene Curtis, stage, film and television actor
 Kent Derricott, well-known TV personality in Japan
 Henry B. Eyring, Second Counselor in the First Presidency of the Church of Jesus Christ of Latter-day Saints
 Jake Gibb, professional beach volleyball player and US Olympian 
 Parker Jacobs, actor, artist and performer
 Chris Jones, software developer, and star of the Tex Murphy PC series
 G.E. Lemmon, cattleman
 Sam Merrill, NBA Player, Utah State University Basketball Star
 James Morrison, actor
 Pete Oswald, illustrator
 George Ouzounian, a.k.a. Maddox (writer)
 Ivy Baker Priest, the United States Treasurer under President Eisenhower; mother of Pat Priest
 Pat Priest, actress (The Munsters) lived in Bountiful until her junior year of high school
 Cal Rampton, former Governor of Utah
 Patrick Rooney, business person
 Jon Schmidt, New Age pianist and composer, member of The Piano Guys
 Norman D. Shumway, former United States congressman
 Millicent Simmonds, Deaf actress best known for her role in the Oscar-nominated film A Quiet Place
 Raymond Ward, Utah State House Representative

See also

 List of cities and towns in Utah
 Headgate Studios
 Skypark Airport
 State Route 68 (Utah)
 West Bountiful, Utah
 Centerville, Utah

References

External links

 

 
Wasatch Front
Cities in Utah
Cities in Davis County, Utah
Populated places established in 1847
Ogden–Clearfield metropolitan area
1847 establishments in Utah